The London Royal Ravens is a British professional Call of Duty League (CDL) esports team based in London, United Kingdom. London Royal Ravens is owned by ReKTGlobal, an esports parent company who also owns Rogue.

History 
ReKTGlobal announced that it had bought the London slot in the CDL on 13 September 2019. The team was the first of the twelve CDL teams to reveal its branding, announced on 15 October 2019 as the London Royal Ravens. The team name was inspired by the Ravens of the Tower of London legend.

On 12 November 2020, it was announced that Sidemen member Vikram "Vikkstar123" Singh Barn had become the co-owner of the team.

Current roster 

 |

References

External links 
 

Call of Duty League teams
Esports teams based in the United Kingdom
Esports teams established in 2019

Sports teams in London